Antonia Carroll Hewitt (born September 29, 1951), later known by her married name Toni Cervantes, is an American former competition swimmer.

As a 17-year-old, Hewitt represented the United States at the 1968 Summer Olympics in Mexico City.  She competed in the women's 100-meter butterfly, and finished seventh in the event final with a time of 1:07.5.  Hewitt also reached the finals of the women's 200-meter butterfly, finishing in fourth place with a time of 2:26.2—three tenths of a second behind American teammate Ellie Daniel, who won the bronze medal in the event.

References

1951 births
Living people
American female butterfly swimmers
Olympic swimmers of the United States
Swimmers from San Francisco
Swimmers at the 1968 Summer Olympics
21st-century American women